Thermotaxis is a behavior in which an organism directs its locomotion up or down a gradient of temperature.

Lab research has determined that some slime molds and small nematodes (namely  Meloidogyne incognita) can migrate along amazingly shallow temperature gradients of less than 0.1C/cm and sometimes as low as 0.001C/cm. Theoretical analysis indicates that even this impressive feat is far from pushing the limits set by thermal noise. The natural environment always contains temperature gradients that organisms could respond to, if it were useful. The response of the  slime mold and nematode is complicated and thought to allow them to move toward an appropriate level in soil. Recent research suggests that mammalian sperm employ thermotaxis to move to an appropriate location in the female's oviduct (see Sperm guidance).

References

Taxes (biology)